Cressac-Saint-Genis is a former commune in the Charente department in southwestern France. On 1 January 2017, it was merged into the new commune Coteaux du Blanzacais.

Population

See also
Communes of the Charente department

References

Former communes of Charente